Aerial survey is a method of collecting geomatics or other imagery by using airplanes, helicopters, UAVs, balloons or other aerial methods. Typical types of data collected include aerial photography, Lidar, remote sensing  (using various visible and invisible bands of the electromagnetic spectrum, such as infrared, gamma, or ultraviolet) and also geophysical data (such as aeromagnetic surveys and gravity. It can also refer to the chart or map made by analysing a region from the air. Aerial survey should be distinguished from satellite imagery technologies because of its better resolution, quality and atmospheric conditions (which can negatively impact and obscure satellite observation). Today, aerial survey is sometimes recognized as a synonym for aerophotogrammetry, part of photogrammetry where the camera is placed in the air. Measurements on aerial images are provided by photogrammetric technologies and methods.

Aerial surveys can provide information on many things not visible from the ground.

Terms used in aerial survey

 exposure station or air station the position of the optical center of the camera at the moment of exposure.
 flying height  the elevation of the exposure station above the datum (usually mean sea level).
altitude the vertical distance of the aircraft above the Earth's surface.
tilt the angle between the aerial camera and the horizontal axis perpendicular to the line of flight.
 tip the angle between the aerial camera and the line of flight.
principal point  the point of intersection of the optical axis of the aerial camera with the photographical plane.
isocentre  the point on the aerial photograph in which the bisector of the angle of tilt meets the photograph.
nadir point the image of the nadir, i.e. the point on the aerial photograph where a plumbline dropped from the front nodal point pierces the photograph.
scale ratio of the focal length of the camera objective and the distance of the exposure station from the ground.
azimuth the clockwise horizontal angle measured about the ground nadir point from the ground survey North meridian in the plane of photograph.
orthomosaic A high-resolution map created by orthophotos, usually via drones is termed as an orthomosaic. Ortho meaning a nadir image and mosaic meaning a collection of images.
Temporal ResolutionTime between observations.

Uses
Aerial surveys are used for:

Archaeology
 Fishery surveys
 Geophysics in geophysical surveys
Hydrocarbon exploration
 Land survey
 Mining and mineral exploration
 Monitoring wildlife and insect populations (called aerial census or sampling)
 Monitoring vegetation and ground cover
 Reconnaissance
 Transportation projects in conjunction with ground surveys (roadway, bridge, highway)

Aerial surveys use a measuring camera where the elements of its interior orientation are known, but with much larger focal length and film and specialized lenses.

Aerial survey sensors
In order to carry out an aerial survey, a sensor needs to be fixed to the interior or the exterior of the airborne platform with line-of-sight to the target it is remotely sensing. With manned aircraft, this is accomplished either through an aperture in the skin of the aircraft or mounted externally on a wing strut. With unmanned aerial vehicles (UAVs), the sensor is typically mounted under or inside.

Aerial survey systems are typically operated with the following:
 Flight navigation software, which directs the pilot to fly in the desired pattern for the survey.
 GNSS, a combination of GPS and inertial measurement unit (IMU) to provide position and orientation information for the data recorded.
 Gyro-stabilized mount to counter the effects of aircraft roll, pitch and yaw.
 Data storage unit to save the data that is recorded.

Examples of aerial survey sensors
 Vexcel UltraCam (Eagle, Falcon, Osprey, Condor) and their calibrations.
 Leica ADS100
 WaldoAir XCAM
 RIEGL LMS-Q780
 Trimble AX80

See also 
 Unmanned aerial photogrammetric survey

References

External links
GIS and remote sensing for archeology
PBS Nova—The Sky's Eyes: Remote Sensing in Archaeology

Surveying
Methods in archaeology
Photogrammetry